Teleena is based in Nieuwegein, the Netherlands. Teleena offers managed mobile service solutions to mobile network operators (MNOs), cable companies, mobile virtual network operators (MVNOs) retail brands and other enterprises throughout the world. Teleena also provides its mobile services to device manufacturers (OEMs), machine-to-machine (M2M/IoT), Cloud and content service providers, as well as (global) enterprises. Since October 2018, Teleena is owned by Tata Communications and also operates under this name.

Company history

Teleena was founded in 2007 by two former Scarlet managers: Timo Smit and Michiel van der Pant, and investor and former founder of Versatel (sold in 2005 to Tele2), Marc van der Heijden. The company has built its own mobile core network (Oracle, Nokia Siemens, Cisco) that is connected to the Radio Access Network of Vodafone in The Netherlands. Vodafone was the last of the three Dutch Mobile Network Operators (MNO) to enter into the mobile wholesale services. In 2008, Teleena signed an agreement with Surinamese MNO Telesur and in 2010 Teleena signed an MVNE agreement with Vodafone in the United Kingdom. The company hosts over a dozen MVNOs in the two countries. In October 2018, Telena was acquired by Tata communications.

References 

Telecommunications companies of the Netherlands
Telecommunications companies of the United Kingdom
Dutch companies established in 2007
2007 establishments in the Netherlands
Companies based in Utrecht (province)
Nieuwegein